Agromyces bracchium is a bacterium from the genus of Agromyces which has been isolated from rhizospheric soil from the tree Bruguiera gymnorhiza from Okinawa in Japan.

References 

Microbacteriaceae
Bacteria described in 2001